Grégory Molitor (born 12 March 1980) is a Luxembourgian professional football player.

External links

1980 births
Living people
Luxembourg international footballers
Luxembourgian footballers
Association football midfielders
FC Avenir Beggen players
F91 Dudelange players
FC Swift Hesperange players